Leitrim is an OC Transpo transit station in the suburban community of Leitrim in Ottawa, Ontario. It is located on Gilligan Road, which is just west of Albion Road and south off Leitrim Road, near the former Bytown and Prescott Railway Line.

The Trillium Line will be extended to Leitrim in 2023. The station will consist of two side platforms and will connect to the existing bus platforms. The Park and ride will be expanded to 330 spaces, with the possibility to expand to 925 spaces in the future.

Service

School routes  and  available at the intersection of Leitrim and Albion.

References

Railway stations scheduled to open in 2023
Trillium Line stations
Transitway (Ottawa) stations